Corpus In Extremis: Analysing Necrocriticism is the second full length album by Swedish goregrind/death metal band General Surgery. It was released on 12 March 2009 through Listenable Records.

Track listing

Personnel
General Surgery
Dr. Eriksson - Bass, Backing Vocals
Dr. Carlsson - Guitars
Dr. Sahlström - Vocals
Dr. Wallin - Guitars, Backing Vocals
Dr. Mitroulis - Drums, Backing Vocals

Guest musicians
Grant McWilliams - Vocals
Karl Envall - Vocals

Production
Soile Siirtola - Photography
Anders Eriksson - Engineering, Mixing
Peter in de Betou - Mastering
Andreas Eriksson - Mixing

2009 albums
Listenable Records albums
General Surgery (band) albums